The SNCASE SE.3200 Frelon (Hornet) is a French helicopter built in the late 1950s. Intended to serve as a multirole helicopter for the French Army, Air Forces and Navy, two prototypes were built and flown before the project was dropped in favour of the SA 3210 Super Frelon.

Design and development

The SNCASE SE.3200 Frelon was a heavy helicopter designed to equip the French Armed Forces, replacing the Sikorsky S-58 built under license by SNCASE (Société nationale des constructions aéronautiques du Sud-Est).

The specifications called for an aircraft  of less than 5 tonnes gross weight. The prototypes were powered by three  Turbomeca Turmo IIIB 750/800 shp turbines to avoid all risk of engine failure: production aircraft were to have used the 1000 hp Turmo IIC. The engines drove a single four blade rotor.

Fuel was held in two large external tanks having a capacity of 1100 liters each. This left the fuselage clear for large loads. The rear fuselage was a swing-tailed unit, which opened to provide clear entry for payloads such as vehicles.
The Frelon was able to carry light vehicles, up to 24 fully equipped troops, or 15 stretchers and two attendants if used as an air ambulance. It was equipped with a fixed tricycle landing gear.

Only two prototypes were built, the first one flying on 10 June 1959 at Paris – Le Bourget Airport.

Specifications

See also

References

1950s French helicopters
Frelon
Three-turbine helicopters
Aircraft first flown in 1959